Justin K. Stearns (born October 13, 1974) is associate professor in Arab Crossroads Studies at NYU Abu Dhabi. The son of Stephen C. Stearns and Beverly P. Stearns and the brother of Jason Stearns, he is married to Nathalie Peutz, a cultural anthropologist and assistant professor in Arab Crossroads Studies at NYU Abu Dhabi.

Education and Training

  B.A. Dartmouth College 1998
  Fulbright Fellow Morocco 1998-1999
  Fulbright-Hays Fellow Spain & Morocco 2003-2004
  PhD Princeton University 2007

Positions

 Assistant Professor of Religion, Middlebury College, 2005-2010
 Assistant Professor in Arab Crossroads Studies, NYU Abu Dhabi 2010-2014
 Associate Professor in Arab Crossroads Studies, NYU Abu Dhabi 2014-
 Chair, Arab Crossroads Studies, Abu Dhabi 2013-2017

Selected publications

Books
 
 

Articles
.
.
.
.
.

Encyclopedia Articles
Entries for al-Hasan al-Yusi and Ibn al-Banna in Dictionary of African Biography (2011)
Entry on “Contagion” for the Encyclopedia of Islam, 3rd edition (2010), 180–82.

References

External links
 http://nyuad.nyu.edu/en/academics/faculty/justin-stearns.html

1974 births
Living people
American male writers